Sir Richard David Jacobs (born 21 December 1956) is a British High Court judge.

Early life and education 
Jacobs was educated at Highgate School. He studied law at Pembroke College, Cambridge and graduated with a first-class degree.

Career 
He was called to the bar at Middle Temple in 1979 and practised from Essex Court Chambers, specialising in commercial law; he was co-head of chambers from 2013 to 2017. While in practice, he also sat as an arbitrator. 

He took silk in 1998 and served as a recorder from 2002 to 2018. In 2003, he was visiting fellow at the London School of Economics. In addition to practice, he co-authored Liability Insurance in International Arbitration: the Bermuda form in 2004 which was taken into a second edition in 2011.

High Court appointment 
On 25 June 2018, he was appointed a judge of the High Court and assigned to the Queen's Bench Division. He received the customary knighthood in the same year. Jacobs sits on the Commercial Court.

Personal life 
In 1990, he married Pamela Fine, with whom he has one son and two daughters.

References 

Living people
1956 births
21st-century English judges
Knights Bachelor
Alumni of Pembroke College, Cambridge
Members of the Middle Temple
People educated at Highgate School
English King's Counsel
20th-century King's Counsel
21st-century King's Counsel